Lee Ik-hwan (born 17 January 1946) is a South Korean speed skater. He competed in two events at the 1968 Winter Olympics.

References

External links
 

1946 births
Living people
South Korean male speed skaters
Olympic speed skaters of South Korea
Speed skaters at the 1968 Winter Olympics
Sportspeople from North Gyeongsang Province